XHPNAS-FM (94.1 FM) is a radio station serving Navolato and Culiacán, Sinaloa. The station is owned by Luz Network and is known as Stereo Uno.

History

XHPNAS-FM was one of two stations won by Luz Network, along with El Fuerte's XHPFRT-FM, in the IFT-4 radio station auction of 2017. It came to air in September 2019, carrying the same Stereo Uno brand and format heard on the company's flagship XHMSL-FM in Los Mochis. It is the first Luz Network station in central Sinaloa.

References

External links
 Official Website

Radio stations in Sinaloa
Radio stations established in 2019
Contemporary hit radio stations in Mexico
2019 establishments in Mexico